Sand is a former municipality in Rogaland county, Norway.  The  municipality encompassed the area around the Hylsfjorden and the inner part of the Sandsfjorden in the present-day Suldal Municipality.  The administrative centre of the municipality was the village of Sand where Sand Church is located.

History
The municipality was created in 1859 when the municipality of Jelsa was split in two. Initially, Sand had 1,600 inhabitants.  On 1 January 1965, the municipality of Sand was dissolved due to the recommendations of the Schei Committee.  Sand was incorporated into the neighboring municipality of Suldal along with Erfjord and parts of Imsland and Jelsa municipalities. Prior to the merger, Sand had 1,135 inhabitants.

Government
All municipalities in Norway, including Sand, are responsible for primary education (through 10th grade), outpatient health services, senior citizen services, unemployment and other social services, zoning, economic development, and municipal roads.  The municipality is governed by a municipal council of elected representatives, which in turn elects a mayor.

Municipal council
The municipal council  of Sand was made up of 13 representatives that were elected to four year terms.  The party breakdown of the final municipal council was as follows:

See also
List of former municipalities of Norway

References

Suldal
Former municipalities of Norway
1859 establishments in Norway
1965 disestablishments in Norway